Jules Gillard (21 December 1904 – 31 October 1983) was a Swiss racing cyclist. He rode in the 1926 Tour de France.

References

1904 births
1983 deaths
Swiss male cyclists
Place of birth missing